Durag-e Madineh (also Romanized as Dūrag-e Madīneh; also known as Dūrakmadīneh and Dowrak) is a village in Rostam-e Do Rural District, in the Central District of Rostam County, Fars Province, Iran. At the 2006 census, its population was 20, in 4 families.

References 

Populated places in Rostam County